Bladen is a surname, and may refer to:

William Bladen (Alderman) (1585–1663), Anglo-Irish Bookseller/Printer and Mayor of Dublin
Thomas Bladen (Priest) (-1695), Anglo-Irish Priest and Bookseller/Printer of Dublin
Nathaniel Bladen (1642–1717), English lawyer - father of Colonel Martin and William Bladen
William Bladen (1672–1718), English lawyer - Attorney-General of Maryland (son of Nathaniel above)
Martin Bladen (1680–1746), Commissioner of the Board of Trade, Comptroller of the Mint (son of Nathaniel above)
Thomas Bladen (1698–1780), Governor of Maryland (son of William above)
Vincent Bladen (1900–1981), Canadian economist
Ronald Bladen (1918–1988), American painter and sculptor
Peter Bladen (1922–2001), Australian poet